Nepeta cataria, commonly known as catnip, catswort, catwort, and catmint, is a species of the genus Nepeta in the family Lamiaceae, native to southern and eastern Europe, the Middle East, Central Asia, and parts of China. It is widely naturalized in northern Europe, New Zealand, and North America. The common name catmint can also refer to the genus as a whole.

The names catnip and catmint are derived from the intense attraction about two-thirds of cats have toward it (alternative plants exist). In addition to its uses with cats, catnip is an ingredient in some herbal teas (or tisanes), and is valued for its sedative and relaxant properties.

Description
In appearance, N. cataria resembles a typical member of the mint family of plants, featuring brown-green foliage with the characteristic square stem of the plant family Lamiaceae. The coarse-toothed leaves are triangular to elliptical in shape. The small, bilabiate flowers of N. cataria are fragrant and are either pink in colour or white with fine spots of pale purple.

Taxonomy
Nepeta cataria was one of the many species described by Linnaeus in 1753 in his landmark work Species Plantarum.

Uses

The plant terpenoid nepetalactone is the main chemical constituent of the essential oil of Nepeta cataria. Nepetalactone can be extracted from catnip by steam distillation.

Cultivation
Nepeta cataria is cultivated as an ornamental plant for use in gardens. It is also grown for its attractant qualities to house cats and butterflies.

The plant is drought-tolerant and deer-resistant. It can be a repellent for certain insects, including aphids and squash bugs. Catnip is best grown in full sunlight and grows as a loosely branching, low perennial.

Varieties include Nepeta cataria var. citriodora (or N. cataria subsp. citriodora), or "lemon catnip", named after its lemon-scented leaves.

Biological control
The iridoid that is deposited on cats who have rubbed themselves against the plants and scratched the surfaces of catnip and silver vine (Actinidia polygama) leaves, repels mosquitoes. The compound iridodial, an iridoid extracted from catnip oil, has been found to attract lacewings that eat aphids and mites.

As an insect repellent
Nepetalactone is a mosquito and fly repellent. Oil isolated from catnip by steam distillation is a repellent against insects, in particular mosquitoes, cockroaches, and termites. Research suggests that, while a more effective spatial repellant than DEET, when compared with SS220 or DEET, it is not so effective as a repellent as it is when used on the skin of humans.

Effect of ingestion on humans
Catnip has a history of use in traditional medicine for a variety of ailments such as stomach cramps, indigestion, fevers, hives, and nervous conditions. The plant has been consumed as a tisane, juice, tincture, infusion, or poultice, and has also been smoked. However, its medicinal use has fallen out of favor with the development of modern medicine.

Effect on felines

Catnip contains the feline attractant nepetalactone. N. cataria (and some other species within the genus Nepeta) are known for their behavioral effects on the cat family, not only on domestic cats, but also other species. Several tests showed that leopards, cougars, servals, and lynxes often reacted strongly to catnip in a manner similar to domestic cats. Lions and tigers may react strongly as well, but they do not react consistently in the same fashion.

With domestic cats, N. cataria is used as a recreational substance for the enjoyment of pet cats, and catnip and catnip-laced products designed for use with domesticated cats are available to consumers. Common behaviors cats display when they sense the bruised leaves or stems of catnip are rubbing on the plant, rolling on the ground, pawing at it, licking it, and chewing it. Consuming much of the plant is followed by drooling, sleepiness, anxiety, leaping about, and purring. Some growl, meow, scratch, or bite at the hand holding it. The main response period after exposure is generally between 5 and 15 minutes, after which olfactory fatigue usually sets in; however, about one-third of cats are not affected by catnip. The behavior is hereditary.

Cats detect nepetalactone through their olfactory epithelium, not through their vomeronasal organ. At the olfactory epithelium, the nepetalactone binds to one or more olfactory receptors.

A 1962 pedigree analysis of 26 cats in a Siamese breeding colony suggested that the catnip response was caused by a Mendelian-dominant gene.

A study published in January 2021 suggests that felines are specifically attracted to the iridoids nepetalactone and nepetalactol, present in catnip and silver vine, respectively. The compounds were found to repel mosquitos, and it is hypothesized that rubbing against the plants provides the cats with a chemical coat that protects them against mosquito bites.

Felines not affected by catnip 
Other plants that have a catnip-like effect on cats include valerian (Valeriana officinalis) root and leaves; silver vine (Actinidia polygama), or matatabi, popular in Asia; and Tatarian honeysuckle (Lonicera tatarica) wood. Many of the one-third of cats that do not respond to catnip do respond to one or more of these three alternatives.

See also

References

Further reading

External links

 USDA Plant Profile: Nepeta cataria (catmint)

Nepeta
Flora of Asia
Flora of Europe
Cat attractants
Perennial plants
Plant toxin insecticides
Garden plants of Asia
Garden plants of Europe
Flora of the Mediterranean Basin
Plants described in 1753